PaykanArtCar is a non-profit organization based in Florida, US.

The organization has purchased a car, now also called the PaykanArtCar, and intends to let different Iranian activist artists paint it annually as an art project, meant to highlight various political issues and repressed communities in Iran. The car is an Iranian Paykan, gifted in 1974 by Shah Mohammad Reza Pahlavi of Iran to Nicolae Ceaușescu, dictator of Romania. It was bought at an auction in 2021 for €95 000.

The art car was first exhibited in October 2021 at the Oslo Freedom Forum in Miami, held by the Human Rights Foundation (HRF). The first artist to paint the car was Alireza Shojaian, an exiled Iranian. Shojaian, who had never used an airbrush before, took inspiration from the story of Rostam, a legendary Persian hero, the art of 20th century Iranian artist Hossein Qollar-Aqasi, and connected them to the 2021 murder of the gay Iranian Ali Fazeli Monfared, as well as the executed Iranian wrestler Navid Afkari. The organization received the Václav Havel Prize for Creative Dissent from the HRF, who said that the car was "a daring piece of art that advocates for human rights and dignity in Iran."

The car has been exhibited in Canada and Brussels, Belgium. It was meant to be shown at AsiaNow, an art fair in Paris, but the invitation was revoked. A representative of AsiaNow stated that "The problem is neither the artist nor the project, but the organization supporting this project, which uses the L.G.B.T.Q.+ cause for priority reasons that are other than purely artistic, and which endanger the safety of the people working with us on our Iranian platform."

It is planned that the second installment of the PaykanArtCar will be painted by a female Iranian artist, and focus on women’s rights in Iran.

PaykanArtCar was founded by Mark Wallace, American ambassador to the United Nations 2006–2009, and Hiva Feizi, the organization's executive director.

See also
BMW Art Car, another car related art project
Human rights in the Islamic Republic of Iran
LGBT rights in Iran

References

External links

PaykanArtCar: A Driving Force Against Human Rights Abuses Tours Canada, sponsored article at ARTnews, with pictures
Car Virtual Video, video by PaykanArtCar
Prize winning car art with a message to Iran, 2022 interview with Hiva Feizi on Radio National

Non-profit organizations based in Florida
LGBT art in the United States
Human rights activism
LGBT political advocacy groups in Florida
1970s cars
Art vehicles
Human rights in Iran
LGBT rights in Iran